The green wood hoopoe (Phoeniculus purpureus) is a large, up to  long, near-passerine tropical bird native to Africa. It is a member of the family Phoeniculidae, the wood hoopoes, and was formerly known as the red-billed wood hoopoe.

Description
This abundant species is a metallic dark green, with a purple back and very long diamond-shaped purple tail. Distinctive white markings on the wings and white chevrons on the tail edges make it easily identifiable, as does its long, thin, curved red bill. Sexes are similar, but immatures have a black bill.

Food and foraging
The green wood hoopoe is an insect-eating species. It feeds mainly on the ground, at termite mounds, or on tree trunks, and forms flocks outside the breeding season. Its specialised claws enable it to cling easily to the underside of branches while closely inspecting the bark for insects.

Calls
This conspicuous bird advertises its presence with its loud kuk-uk-uk-uk-uk call and other vocalisations.

Breeding
The green wood hoopoe is a cooperative breeder and common resident in the forests, woodlands and suburban gardens of most of sub-Saharan Africa. It is found in groups of up to a dozen or so birds with only one breeding pair. The breeding female lays two to four blue eggs in a natural tree hole or old barbet nest and incubates them for about 18 days. On hatching, she and the nestlings are fed by the rest of the group, even after they have fledged and left the nest hole. The group is fearless in defence of the nestlings against intruders. This species is parasitised by the greater and lesser honeyguide.

Status
Widespread and common throughout its large range, the green wood hoopoe is assessed as Least Concern on the IUCN Red List of Threatened Species.

Gallery

References 

 Birds of The Gambia by Barlow, Wacher and Disley,

External links 
 BirdLife Species Factsheet
 Redbilled woodhoopoe – Species text in The Atlas of Southern African Birds.
 Photograph of a Green Woodhoopoe

green wood hoopoe
Birds of Sub-Saharan Africa
green wood hoopoe
green wood hoopoe